Salmaan King, previously Graham King (born 13 March 1985 in Cape Town), is a South African football (soccer) midfielder playing as left-winger.

He hails from Mitchell's Plain on the Cape Flats.

References

External links

1985 births
Living people
Sportspeople from Cape Town
Cape Coloureds
South African soccer players
Association football midfielders
Cape Town Spurs F.C. players
Maritzburg United F.C. players
Santos F.C. (South Africa) players
Free State Stars F.C. players
Cape Town All Stars players
South African Premier Division players
National First Division players